Nanatsumen (七つ面)  is a play in the Kabuki repertoire, and one of the celebrated Kabuki Jūhachiban ("Eighteen Great Plays"). The play is known in English as The Seven Masks.

References
NANATSU MEN
Seven Masks (Nanatsumen)

1740 plays
Kabuki plays